Greg Blaine (born March 24, 1961) was an American politician, dairy farmer, and businessman.

Blaine lived in Little Falls, Minnesota with his wife and family and graduated from Little Falls High School. He went to Central Lakes College for farm business management and to St. Cloud Technical and Community College for graphic arts. Blaine was a dairy farmer and was involved with the printing business. Blaine served in the Minnesota House of Representatives from 2001 to 2006 and was a Republican.

References

1961 births
Living people
People from Little Falls, Minnesota
Businesspeople from Minnesota
Farmers from Minnesota
Republican Party members of the Minnesota House of Representatives